Samone (Samón in local dialect) is a comune (municipality) in Trentino in the northern Italian region Trentino-Alto Adige/Südtirol, located about  east of Trento.

Samone is an enclave in the Castel Ivano municipality.

References

Cities and towns in Trentino-Alto Adige/Südtirol